Al-Thawrah Subdistrict or Al-Thawrah Nahiyah  is a Syrian Nahiyah (Subdistrict) located in Al-Thawrah District in Raqqa.  According to the Syria Central Bureau of Statistics (CBS), Al-Thawrah Subdistrict had a population of 69,425 in the 2004 census.

References 

Subdistricts of Raqqa Governorate